The Seventh Legislative Council of Hong Kong is the current meeting of the legislative branch of the Hong Kong Special Administrative Region Government. It is scheduled to meet in the Legislative Council Complex, from 1 January 2022 to 31 December 2025, overlapping the six months of Carrie Lam as the fifth term of the Chief Executive and the sixth term of Chief Executive. The membership of the Legislative Council will be determined in the December 2021 election.

Originally scheduled for 6 September 2020, Chief Executive Carrie Lam postponed the election for a whole year on 31 July 2020. On 11 March 2021, the National People's Congress (NPC) passed a decision to drastically overhaul Hong Kong electoral system, which was followed by the Carrie Lam administration promulgated the Improving Electoral System (Consolidated Amendments) Ordinance 2021, which changed the general election of the seventh term of the Legislative Council from 5 September to 19 December 2021. Under the Ordinance, the membership of the Legislative Council increased from 70 to 90 and the members were elected by the Election Committee with 40 seats, functional constituencies with 30 seats, and geographical constituencies with 20 seats respectively.

Major events
 1 January 2022: Commencement of this Council's term of office.
 3 January 2022: Oath-taking ceremony.
 4 January 2022: Nomination for the president. Andrew Leung re-elected unopposed as the only candidate.
 10 January 2022: Originally scheduled for election of the president but cancelled.
 12 January 2022: Council's first session was convened.
 19 June 2022: Resignation of Horace Cheung, Alice Mak, Sun Dong and Nelson Lam after appointed as officials of the new government headed by Chief Executive-elect John Lee.
 18 December 2022: By-election for vacancies of Election Committee constituency. Chan Wing-kwong, Adrian Ho, Shang Hailong, William Wong elected.
 27 December 2022: Resignation of Stephen Wong after appointed as head of Chief Executive's Policy Unit.

Leadership

 President: Andrew Leung (BPA)

Pro-Beijing camp
 Convenor: Martin Liao
 Deputy Convenor: Starry Lee

Centrist
 Convenor: Tik Chi-yuen (as the only member who does not belong to the Pro-Beijing camp)

Secretariat
 Secretary General: Kenneth Chen

Composition

List of Members

Seat change

Committees
 House Committee
 Parliamentary Liaison Subcommittee
 Finance Committee
 Establishment Subcommittee
 Public Works Subcommittee
 Public Accounts Committee
 Committee on Members' Interests
 Committee on Rules of Procedure

Panels
 Panel on Administration of Justice and Legal Services
 Panel on Commerce and Industry
 Panel on Constitutional Affairs
 Panel on Development
 Panel on Economic Development
 Panel on Education
 Panel on Environmental Affairs
 Panel on Financial Affairs
 Panel on Food Safety and Environmental Hygiene
 Panel on Health Services
 Panel on Home Affairs
 Panel on Housing
 Panel on Information Technology and Broadcasting
 Panel on Manpower
 Panel on Security
 Panel on Transport
 Panel on Welfare Services

See also
 2021 Hong Kong legislative election
 2022 President of the Hong Kong Legislative Council election

Notes

References

Terms of the Legislative Council of Hong Kong
2021 Hong Kong legislative election
2021 establishments in Hong Kong